The varied carpet beetle (Anthrenus verbasci) is a 3 mm-long beetle belonging to the family Dermestidae. They are a common species, often considered a pest of domestic houses and, particularly, natural history museums, where the larvae may damage natural fibers and can damage carpets, furniture, clothing, and insect collections. A. verbasci was also the first insect to be shown to have an annual  behavioral rhythm and to date remains a classic example of circannual cycles in animals.

Description
 
The body is rounded, almost spherical. The elytra and pronotum are covered in fine scales of different colours, creating an irregular pattern of white, brownish and yellowish patches on these features. The white scales are focussed along the lateral margins of the pronotum and on the elytra, where they form three bright, wavy transverse bands. In addition to these morphological features, their antennae are 11-segmented, with a club of 3 segments.

The larvae are elongated and densely covered in large setae (hairs). These hairs are organised into alternating, transverse groups of light and dark-brown patches: the larva appears covered in brown stripes. The body is usually wider at the back than at the front where it also bears 3 pairs of hair tufts along its rear abdomen that can be used for self-defense.

Life cycle

A. verbasci has a life cycle ranging from 1–3 years, depending upon the environmental conditions. A study in 1958 found that temperature is able to affect larval development, concluding that the periods of incubation and pupation of A. verbasci decrease with increase of temperature (the life cycle is thus quickened with a moderate rise in temperature). Incubation decreased from 54 days at 15 °C to 12 days at 30 °C, and the pupation decreased from 89 days at 10 °C to 9 days at 25 °C. Relative humidity was shown to have little effect.

Larvae hatch from eggs in the spring and early summer, often in the nests of birds (including those of the house sparrow and house swift) or around stored fabrics.

Adults emerge between late May and early August (in England), flying to and feeding on the pollen and nectar of flowering plants. The life expectancy of the beetle is about two weeks. During this period, mating occurs and the eggs are laid, either close to the human environs or in bird nests, tree hollows and similar, dry places where larvae can find their food. Then the cycle begins anew.

Distribution and habitat
This species is present in most of Europe, in the eastern Palearctic realm, in the Near East, in the Nearctic realm, in North Africa and in North Asia, also in the Neotropics.

Diet and behaviour
Larvae feed on keratin and chitin of natural fibers (dead insects, animal hair and feathers) throughout their development, eventually experiencing a dormancy period (also known as diapause) prior to pupation into the adult stage. The length of the dormancy appears to depend on environmental factors, with the most likely zeitgeber, or trigger, being photoperiod. Adults feed on the pollen and nectar of flowering plants.

Predators
Among the natural predators of A. verbasci, one of the most well-studied is the parasitoid wasp Laelius pedatus (in the family Bethylidae). Upon discovering an A. verbasci larva, a female wasp will land on the larva's dorsal side and attempt to line up its long, stinger-like ovipositor for a paralyzing blow to the thorax. In response, the larva will erect long hairs on their abdomen and attempt to brush these hairs against the encroaching wasp. The hairs detach and stick to the wasp on contact, presumably causing some sort of irritation. Evidently, such irritation is not enough to deter an attack on A. verbasci larvae, as the vast majority of attacks are successful. By comparison, the closely related beetle species Anthrenus flavipes – which has slightly longer hairs than A. verbasci – uses such a defense more effectively.

After a single successful sting, the beetle is permanently paralyzed. The entire process from landing to complete paralysis lasts approximately 40 seconds. L. pedatus does not lay eggs immediately after the beetle is paralyzed, waiting as long as 24 hours before oviposition. During this time, she grooms herself, removing any hairs that might have stuck to her during the attack. During this lengthy process she appears to monitor the larva's state of paralysis by repeatedly biting it and monitoring its reaction. Once sufficiently clear of hairs, the wasp creates a bare patch on the larva's abdomen and lays 2–4 eggs. Eggs hatch in 3–4 days and the larvae feed on the beetle for 3–7 days, eventually killing the host. They then spin cocoons near the empty shell of the host, emerging some time later as adult wasps.

Interaction with humans

As a domestic pest

The larvae of A. verbasci are a common household pest. Adult beetles usually lay their eggs in air ducts, in closets, under furniture, or under baseboards. Once hatched and until they pupate into adults, the larvae hide in dark, undisturbed areas and feed on organic material. The larvae are thus responsible for the damage of various items, such as furniture, clothing, blankets, furs, and carpets. They are commonly found in musical instruments which have been stored for lengthy periods of time, feeding on pads and felts most commonly found in woodwind instruments.

As a museum pest
Collections of specimens, especially of insects, are also vulnerable to attack, making A. verbasci a common pest in museums. In a 1987 survey of British national history museums, at least five noted that A. verbasci was categorised as a major pest for biological collections. Larvae are often found in the nests of sparrows and wagtails, and so larvae and adults may enter museums at upper levels through windows and roof spaces.

Infestations can be prevented by removing the larvae and adults through regular vacuum cleaning, dry cleaning or airing clothing outside, placing naphthalene balls in closets, and removing abandoned bird and insect nests attached to the building. Signs of an infestation include the presence of damaged articles, moulted larval skins in dark areas, and an abundance of adult beetles near windows. Susceptible people may also find that hairs shed from the larvae cause irritated itchy welts that may be confused with bedbug bites. Deterring or killing A. verbasci can be accomplished using insecticides, oxygen deprivation, freezing, and pheromone and scent traps.

References

External links

Biolib
Fauna Europaea
Invertebrate Ireland on line
Dermestidae of the World Habitus, abdomen and antennae.
Varied Carpet Beetle Fact Sheet
Varied Carpet Beetle Allergy and Treatment
Museumpests.net - Varied Carpet Beetle Museum factsheet
Dermestid Beetle
Carpet Beetles and Clothes Moths
Varied Carpet Beetles feeding on allium flowers
Wikispecies

Anthrenus
Agricultural pest insects
Beetles described in 1767
Beetles of Europe
Taxa named by Carl Linnaeus